Opytne is a village in Pokrovsk Raion (district) in Donetsk Oblast of eastern Ukraine, at about  NW from the center of Donetsk city and at about  north from the Donetsk airfield.

Starting Mid-April 2014 pro-Russian separatists captured several towns and cities across in Donetsk and Luhansk Districts; since 
6 November 2014 Opytne was fully under Ukrainian control. The village became one of the frontlines of the War in Donbass. On 24 November 2016 one Ukrainian serviceman was killed by a sniper in the village. In late 2019 less than 50 people lived in Opytne, while almost all of the village had been damaged or destroyed. As of November 2021, only 38 remain. On November 11 2022, Opytne was captured by DPR and Russian Armed Forces.

References

External links
 Weather forecast for Opytne

Media coverage
 Ukraine: An evening on the front line with troops in Donetsk (video 01:59), BBC World News, 29 July 2015. 
 Holding the Line for Another DNR Assault: Ukraine's Failed Ceasefire (Part 2) (video 14:05), Vice News, 30 July 2015

Villages in Pokrovsk Raion